Granma is one of the provinces of Cuba. Its capital is Bayamo. Other towns include Manzanillo (a port on the Gulf of Guacanayabo) and Pilón.

History
The province takes its name from the yacht Granma, used by Che Guevara and Fidel Castro to land in Cuba with 82 guerrillas on December 2, 1956; until 1976 the area formed part of Santiago de Cuba larger province "Oriente Province". The American who sold the guerillas the secondhand yacht in Mexico apparently had named it "Granma" ("Granma", more usually "Grandma", is an affectionate term for a grandmother) after his grandmother.
The name of the vessel became an icon for Cuban communism.

The province is full of reminders of the Cuban Revolution, and of the Cuban Wars of Independence; plaques in the mountain commemorate the 1959 struggle against Fulgencio Batista. Other sites, unmarked, include archaeological digs, the sites of several palenques, and the fortified hamlets of escaped slaves. In 2005 Hurricane Dennis destroyed the site of Castro's headquarters at La Plata. There are numerous abandoned gold, silver, and manganese mine sites.

At the 2018 parliamentary election, Granma was the province with the highest proportion of votes recorded for the full list.

This is the highest temperature to have ever been recorded in Cuba.

Economy
The majority of the revenue comes from coffee grown in the mountainous regions of the province. During the coffee harvest soldiers may set up roadblocks to ensure the delivery of the coffee to the government and not to the black market.

Municipalities

Source: Population from 2004 Census. Area from 1976 municipal re-distribution.

Demographics
In 2004, the province of Granma had a population of 829,333.

See also
Oriente

References

External links

 Granma Portal

 
Provinces of Cuba
States and territories established in 1976